David Sandström is a drummer.

David Sandström may also refer to:

David Sandström (ReGenesis character)

See also
Sven-David Sandström, Swedish composer